Thomas McLaughlin (born September 20, 1979), better known by his stage name McRocklin, is an English guitar player, music producer and mastering engineer. He was the guitarist featured in Steve Vai's music video "The Audience is Listening" (1990). He then became the lead guitarist in Bad4Good, a band produced by Vai in 1991. He is currently the lead guitarist and co-producer of the band McRocklin & Hutch.

Biography 
McRocklin started playing the guitar at the age of four. By the time he was seven, he was performing onstage. His first big break came when he opened for Ozzy Osbourne in his hometown of Newcastle upon Tyne, at just eight years old.

McRocklin went on to star in Steve Vai's music video "The Audience is Listening" and Vai became a close friend and mentor to him. During this time, McRocklin was gifted the custom-made Ibanez 7-String Universe. Steve Vai used this guitar on his Passion and Warfare album.

McRocklin also featured in the Warner Bros. documentary Legends of the Guitar presented by Jeff "Skunk" Baxter, at the age of 11, along with other guitar greats.

Time in the US 
As the youngest person to be signed to Interscope Records at the time, the band Bad4Good (B4G) was formed around him. B4G released an album which was co-written and produced by Steve Vai.

During this time McRocklin also joined Zakk Wylde, Steve Lukather, Stuart Hamm and others on stage for the Jason Becker Benefit concert.

Back in the UK 
After returning to the UK, he released his own solo album 91-95. He also became more involved in production, which led to becoming a mastering engineer. It also fueled his interest in electronic genres of music, which took him away from the guitar.

McRocklin reentered the guitar scene almost 20 years later and is now producing new music. He produced a guitar-based EP entitled New Beginnings and gained a large following on Instagram, Facebook and YouTube.  McRocklin also formed the Shredwave band McRocklin & Hutch, which is inspired by 1980s rock, cult movies and 21st-century tech. In 2018, McRocklin was invited to write and perform guitars on Gunship's The Video Game Champion.

McRocklin & Hutch also joined Dragonforce on the UK leg of their 2019 Extreme Power Metal tour with their album Riding Out.

In December 2019, McRocklin launched his own online teaching platform, schoolofmcrock.com.

Equipment

Endorsements 
Since returning to playing guitar and producing music, McRocklin has become an artist for brands such as:
 Ibanez
 Kiesel Guitars
 Eventide
 Fractal Audio
 Aston Microphone
 D'Addario
 Fishman

References

External links 
 
 School of McRock
 
 Interview with bravewords.com
 Interview with Adam Roach Podcast

1979 births
English rock guitarists
Lead guitarists
Living people
Musicians from Newcastle upon Tyne